Liliom is a 1909 play by Ferenc Molnár.

Liliom may also refer to following films based on the stage play:

 Liliom (1919 film), a film by Michael Curtiz
 Liliom (1930 film), a film by Frank Borzage
 Liliom (1934 film), a film by Fritz Lang

See also
 Liliomfi, a 1954 Hungarian comedy film